Frank Leslie (1841 – August 1, 1882) was a private in the Union Army and a Medal of Honor recipient for his actions in the American Civil War.

Leslie enlisted in the Army from New York City in December 1862, and was assigned as a corporal to the 4th New York Cavalry. He was captured at Warrenton Springs in June 1863 and paroled, and was reduced to private. Following his MOH action, he was again promoted to corporal, and transferred to the 9th New York Cavalry in February 1865. He mustered out with his regiment in July 1865.

Medal of Honor citation
Rank and organization: Private, Company B, 4th New York Cavalry. Place and date: At Front Royal, Va., August 15, 1864. Entered service at: ------. Birth: England. Date of issue: August 26, 1864.

Citation:

Capture of colors of 3d Virginia Infantry (C.S.A.).

See also

List of American Civil War Medal of Honor recipients: G–L

References

External links

1841 births
1882 deaths
British emigrants to the United States
English-born Medal of Honor recipients
United States Army Medal of Honor recipients
Union Army soldiers
American people of Scottish descent
American Civil War recipients of the Medal of Honor
People from Minneapolis, Kansas
People of New York (state) in the American Civil War